Michael Constantine (born Gus Efstratiou (Ευστρατίου); May 22, 1927 – August 31, 2021) was an American actor. He is most widely recognized for his portrayal of Kostas "Gus" Portokalos, the Windex bottle-toting Greek father of Toula Portokalos (Nia Vardalos), in the film My Big Fat Greek Wedding (2002). Earlier, he earned acclaim for his television work, especially as the long-suffering high school principal, Seymour Kaufman, on ABC's comedy-drama, Room 222, for which he won the Primetime Emmy Award for Outstanding Supporting Actor in a Comedy Series in 1970; he was again recognized by the Emmy Awards, as well as the Golden Globe Awards, the following year. After the conclusion of Room 222, Constantine portrayed night court magistrate Matthew J. Sirota on the 1976 sitcom Sirota's Court, receiving his second Golden Globe nomination. Constantine reprised his role as Gus Portokalos in My Big Fat Greek Wedding 2 (2016).

Early life
Constantine was born Gus Efstratiou in Reading, Pennsylvania. He was the son of Andromache (née Fotiadou) and Theocharis Ioannides Efstratiou (a steel worker), both immigrants from Greece.

Career
He began his career on the New York stage in the mid-1950s as understudy to Paul Muni in Inherit the Wind. While in the cast, he met and married actress Julianna McCarthy on October 5, 1953; they had two children, Thea Eileen and Brendan Neil. The marriage ended in divorce in 1969, the same year that Constantine began his role on Room 222. He later married Kathleen Christopher, though they also later divorced.

He studied acting with such prominent mentors as Howard Da Silva and played character roles on and off Broadway in his mid-twenties, supplementing his income as a night watchman and shooting-gallery barker. In 1959, he appeared in his first film, The Last Mile (1959). He had a small but memorable supporting role in The Hustler (1961). In 1964 and 1965, Constantine appeared on Perry Mason, both times as the murderer. He played the role of wannabe private eye Dillard in "The Case of the Blonde Bonanza", then he played Pappy Ryan in "The Case of the Runaway Racer". In 1967, he appeared in the first part of "The Judgment", the two-episode conclusion of The Fugitive, starring David Janssen. Constantine played a long-suffering anti-organized-crime agent in Walt Disney's caper film The North Avenue Irregulars (1979), where he appeared alongside Edward Herrmann and Cloris Leachman. He also played an organized crime mobster who worked for Frank Nitti in the television version of The Untouchables. In 1988, he played the estranged father of one of the main characters in Friday the 13th: the Series.

He played Santa Claus in Prancer (1989). In 1993, Constantine appeared in the independent drama Question of Faith, starring Anne Archer and Sam Neill. He played Tadzu Lempke in Stephen King's Thinner (1996). In 2002, he enjoyed an unexpected comeback as the Windex-toting Gus Portokalos in the hit movie My Big Fat Greek Wedding, a role he reprised on the short-lived television series My Big Fat Greek Life, and a sequel film with the original cast, My Big Fat Greek Wedding 2, which was released on March 25, 2016.

Constantine died at his home in Reading on August 31, 2021, at age 94, from natural causes.

Filmography

Film

Television 

Constantine was cast as the historical John Chisum in the 1965 episode, "Paid in Full", on the syndicated television anthology series, Death Valley Days. He also appeared in another 1965 Death Valley Days episode "The Great Turkey War".

Constantine's other television appearances include:

 Brenner (1 episode, 1959)
 Target: The Corruptors! (1 episode), 1961
 The Untouchables (5 episodes, 1961–1963)
 The Lloyd Bridges Show (2 episodes, 1962–1963)
 The Eleventh Hour as Dr. Jamison in episode "And God Created Vanity" (1963)
 The Dakotas as Marshak in "Trouble at French Creek" (1963)
 Channing (1 episode, 1963) as Nick in "No Wild Games for Sophie" (1963)
 Gunsmoke (2 episodes, 1963–1968)
 The Twilight Zone (1 episode, 1964) as Sheriff Koch in "I Am the Night Color Me Black"
 Slattery's People (1964) one episode as Hungerford in "Remember The Dark Sins of Youth?"
 Perry Mason (2 episodes, 1964–1965)
 The Outer Limits (episode 46 "Counterweight", 1964)
 My Favorite Martian (TV series) (2 episodes, 1965–1966)
 Profiles in Courage (2 episodes, 1964)
 The Virginian (1 episode, 1965)
 Voyage to the Bottom of the Sea – The Indestructible Man (1 episode 1965)
 The Fugitive (3 episodes, 1965–1967) (Ernie Svoboda, Ben Wyckoff, Arthur Art Howe)
 I Spy (2 episodes, 1966)
 12 O'Clock High (1 episode, 1966)
 The Road West in episode "To Light a Candle" (series, 1966)
 The Dick Van Dyke Show (1 episode, 1966)
 The Jean Arthur Show (2 episodes as Carnella, 1966)
 Hogan's Heroes (1 episode, 1966) as Heinrich -episode- "It Takes a Thief...Sometimes"
 Hey Landlord (series, 1966–1967)
 Combat! (as Jacques Patron, episode "Entombed", 1967) 
 Dundee and the Culhane (1 episode, 1967 series)
 The Invaders (1 episode, 1968)
 The Flying Nun (as Juan, episode "Sister Lucky", 1968) 
 Mission: Impossible (1 episode, 1969) (Nikor Janos)
 Room 222 Series – Seymour Kaufman (1969–1974)
 Bonanza (as a new settler whose greedy neighbor refuses him piped water for irrigation)
 The Odd Couple (series, 1970–1975)
 Mary Tyler Moore (1 episode, 1971)
 Night Gallery (1970-1973) 1 episode "The Boy Who Predicted Earthquakes".
 The Streets of San Francisco – Al Davies – in episode "A Wrongful Death" (series, 1973)
 The Krofft Supershow: Electra Woman and Dyna Girl (4 episodes, 1976) as The Sorcerer
 Sirota's Court (13 episodes, 1976–1977 series)
 79 Park Avenue (miniseries, 1977)
 Roots: The Next Generations (miniseries, 1979)
 Quincy, M.E. (4 episodes) (1979 Season 4 Episodes 14 & 15 "Walk Softly Through the Night" Parts 1 and 2) (1981 Dr Arthur Clotti – in season 6, episode 14 "Seldom Silent, Never Heard") ( 1983 Season 8 Episode 3 "Give Me Your Weak") 
 Fantasy Island (1 episode, 1980)
 Benson 1982 season 4 episodes 1 & 2 as Marvin Musker
 The Love Boat (2 episodes, 1983)
 Amanda's (1 episode, 1983)
 Mama's Family (1 episode, 1983)
 The Fall Guy (1 episode, 1983)
 Remington Steele (3 episodes, 1984–1986)
 Simon & Simon (3 episodes, 1984–1988)
 Highway to Heaven (1 episode, 1985)
 Airwolf (1 episode, 1985)
 MacGyver (2 episodes, 1985–1987) – Inspector Jan Messic
 Murder, She Wrote (2 episodes, 1985–1988)
 Magnum, P.I. (1 episode, 1986) 
 Friday the 13th: The Series ("Pipe Dream" 1988)
 Probe ("Plan 10 From Outer Space", 1988)
 Law & Order (2 episodes, 1992–1994)
 Cosby (1 episode, 1997)
 My Big Fat Greek Life (7 episodes, 2003)
 Cold Case'' (1 episode, 2007)

References

External links 
 
 
 

1927 births
2021 deaths
20th-century American male actors
21st-century American male actors
Male actors from Pennsylvania
American male film actors
American male stage actors
American male television actors
American people of Greek descent
Outstanding Performance by a Supporting Actor in a Comedy Series Primetime Emmy Award winners
Actors from Reading, Pennsylvania